Maculabatis macrura is a species of stingray in the family Dasyatidae.

References

macrura
Taxa named by Pieter Bleeker
Fish described in 1852